Aarum Anyaralla is a 1978 Indian Malayalam-language film, directed by Jeassy. The film stars M. G. Soman, Jayabharathi, Sukumari and Adoor Bhasi. The film has musical score by M. K. Arjunan.

Cast
Sukumari 
Jayabharathi 
KPAC Lalitha 
Adoor Bhasi 
Sankaradi 
Adoor Bhavani 
Bahadoor 
Kuthiravattam Pappu 
M. G. Soman

Soundtrack
The music was composed by M. K. Arjunan and the lyrics were written by Sathyan Anthikkad.

References

External links
 

1978 films
1970s Malayalam-language films
Films based on Malayalam novels